Corwith  may refer to:
Placenames
 Corwith, Iowa, USA
 Corwith Township, Michigan, USA
 Corwith Yards in Chicago, Illinois, USA

Other
Corwith Cramer (ship), a brigantine owned by the Sea Education Association (SEA) sailing school